U-28 or U-XXVIII may refer to:

 German submarine U-28, one of several vessels
 , an Austro-Hungarian submarine
 U-28A Draco, a military variant of the Pilatus PC-12 aircraft used by the United States Air Force

See also
 GE U28C